The Hula massacre took place between 31 October and 1 November 1948. Hula is a village in Lebanon 3 km west of Kibbutz Manara, not far from the Litani River. It was captured on October 24 by the Carmeli Brigade of the Israel Defense Forces without any resistance. The women and children were expelled, most of the men aged between 15 and 60 were shot. In total between 35 and 58 men were executed in a house which was later blown up on top of them.

Two officers were responsible for the massacre.  One of them, First Lieutenant Shmuel Lahis, who served as company commander, was put on trial in an Israeli military court, where he was given a seven-year sentence later reduced on appeal to one year, and was released in 1950.  He received a retrospective presidential amnesty in 1955. He became a lawyer, and later director general of the Jewish Agency. Some Israelis opposed this appointment because of his involvement in the Hula massacre.

At his trial, Lahis put forth the defence that the crime had been committed outside the borders of Israel.  The military court rejected this defence but gave Lahis a postponement so that he could appeal this point to the High Court of Justice.  In the same HCJ case, the Israeli government argued that the HCJ did not have the right to interpret military law.  In February 1949, the HCJ rejected both the claim of Lahis and the claim of the government, allowing the trial to continue.

Eye witness account 
At the time of Lahis' nomination to head the Jewish Agency, Lahis's immediate superior in the Carmeli Brigade, Dov Yermiya, wrote to Jewish Agency Chairman Arie Dulzin about Lahis' role in the 1948 massacre. After Lahis' appointment in the role, the controversy was reported in the Israeli media and caused debate in the Knesset.  Yermiya's letter was later published in the newspaper Al Hamishmar.

"I received a report that there had been no resistance in the village, that there was no enemy activity in the area, and that about a hundred people were left in the village. They had surrendered and requested to stay. The men among them were kept in one house under guard. I was brought there and saw about 35 men. [Yermiya does not remember the exact number today, and there were in fact over 50 men there] in the age range 15-60, including one Lebanese soldier in uniform [who was not killed].... When I returned to the village the following morning with an order to send the villagers away, I found out that, while I was away, two of the troops' officers had killed all of the captives who were in the house with a sub-machine gun, and had then blown up the house on top of them to be their grave. The women and children were sent west."

"When I asked him why he had done this, the officer answered that this was 'his revenge for the murder of his best friends in the Haifa Oil Refinery massacre.'" (Journal of Palestine Studies, vol. VII, no. 4 (summer 1978), no. 28, pp. 143-145)

After the Dulzin found out Lahis's actions he detained him and reported the crime to the brigade and sent a new officer to command the company.  

Dulzin's response to Yermiya's letter said that Lahis' past had been known to the Jewish Agency since 1961.  It also revealed that when Lahis had applied to be registered as a lawyer in 1955 the matter had been examined by the Israeli Legal Council.  It was decided that the act which was the reason for Lahis' trial at the military courts was "not an act that carries with it a stigma" (quoted by Dulzin, as translated by JPS).

See also 
 Killings and massacres during the 1948 Palestine War
 List of massacres in Lebanon
 Operation Hiram

External links
 An article (no title given) by R. Barkan from the Mapam newspaper Al Hamishmar, quoting a letter from eyewitness Dov Yermiya and the Jewish Agency's response, translated in the Journal of Palestine Studies, vol. VII, no. 4 (summer 1978), no. 28, pp. 143–145.
 B. Morris, The Birth of the Palestinian Refugee Problem Revisited, Cambridge University Press, 2004.  pp481,487,501,502.

References

Battles and operations of the 1948 Arab–Israeli War
Massacres in Lebanon
1948 in Lebanon
Mass murder in 1948
Massacres in 1948
Massacres committed by Israel
Massacres of men
October 1948 events in Asia
November 1948 events in Asia
Zionist terrorism
Violence against men in Asia
War crimes in Lebanon